The Cathedral Choral Society is a 200-voice symphonic, volunteer chorus based at the Washington National Cathedral.  The late J. Reilly Lewis was music director from 1985-2016.  He succeeded Paul Callaway, who founded the group in 1941. The ensemble performs primarily at the Washington National Cathedral, and also appears regularly at such venues as the Kennedy Center and Wolf Trap.

In 2006, the Society announced the establishment of an endowment fund in memory of Richard Wayne Dirksen, who served the society in wide-ranging capacities during his half-century tenure at the Cathedral. The endowment will commission new carols and help support the ensemble's annual Joy of Christmas concerts.

External links
Cathedral Choral Society official website

Choirs in Washington, D.C.
Choral societies
Musical groups established in 1941
1941 establishments in Washington, D.C.
Performing arts in Washington, D.C.
Church choirs
American church music
Washington National Cathedral